Ruiz Pineda is a Caracas Metro station on Line 2. It was opened on 4 October 1987 as part of the inaugural section of Line 2 from La Paz to Las Adjuntas and Zoológico, on the branch leading to Las Adjuntas. The station is between Mamera and Las Adjuntas.

References

Caracas Metro stations
1987 establishments in Venezuela
Railway stations opened in 1987